Clelia Lollini (May 1, 1890 – November 24, 1963) was an Italian medical doctor. She helped to found the Medical Women's International Federation and the Italian Women's Medical Association.

Early life
Clelia Lollini was born in Rome, the daughter of Vittorio Lollini and Elisa Agnini. Her father was a lawyer and her mother was a journalist and feminist. All four of the Lollini daughters (Olga, Clara, Livia, and Clelia) pursued higher education and professional careers. Clelia Lollini finished her medical degree in 1915.

Career
During World War I she enlisted and worked as a surgeon at a military hospital in Venice. In 1919 she attended the YWCA's  International Conference of Women Physicians in New York, where she gave a lecture on "Prostitution and Prophylaxis of Venereal Disease in Italy", and described her efforts to add social hygiene to Italian public school curricula. She also opened a prenatal clinic for unmarried women in Rome.

She became one of the founders of the Medical Women's International Federation. She and Myra Carcupino-Ferrari founded the Italian Women's Medical Association (AIDM) soon after.  Her own experience of tuberculosis, including a two-year stay in a sanatorium, led to her focus on the care of tubercular patients. From 1930 to 1938 she was in charge of the Anti-Tubercular Consortium of Massa. She moved to Tripoli in 1938 and continued her work on tuberculosis there.

Personal life and legacy
Clelia Lollini spoke Italian, French, German, English, and Arabic. She died in 1963, aged 73 years, in Tripoli, after an eye surgery.

Silvia Mori wrote a novel, Polveri di Luna (2014), based on Lollini's time at the anti-tubercular consortium in Massa.

References

1890 births
1963 deaths
20th-century Italian physicians
Italian women physicians
Physicians from Rome
20th-century women physicians
20th-century Italian women